The whipnose anglers are a family, Gigantactinidae, of deep-sea anglerfishes. The family name is derived from the Greek words gigas, meaning "big", and aktis, meaning "ray". They are distinguished by the presence of a remarkably long lure (the illicium), which may be longer than the body of the fish.

Description
Whipnose angler females are easily recognizable because they have an elongated shape and a small head. Their illicium length is an average of one to four times the size of their standard length. The family includes 22 species in two genera. Like the other ceratioid groups, little is known about their ecology, but this species lives a benthic lifestyle while possibly swimming upside down while it is foraging. They tend to drift motionless to lure in their prey.

Species of this family show extreme sexual dimorphism, with males being dwarves and females significantly larger.  The maximum female size is 43.5 cm, with the corresponding male being 2.2 cm.

Location
Whipnose anglers can be found in all three major oceans. The northernmost location of the females has been recorded near southern Greenland, while the southernmost location was recorded at 50°S in the Atlantic sector of the Southern Hemisphere. The species may possibly be one of the deepest-living ceratoids at maximum depths exceeding 1000 m.

References

Deep sea fish
Bioluminescent fish
Lophiiformes
Gigantactinidae